Ballinriddera is a townland in County Westmeath, Ireland.

Ballinriddera is one of 14 townlands of the civil parish of Multyfarnham in the barony of Corkaree in the Province of Leinster. 

The neighbouring townlands are: Monintown to the east, Killintown and Stonehall to the south, Ballinphort and Lismalady to the west.

In the 1911 census of Ireland there were 5 houses and 28 inhabitants in the townland.

References

External links
Map of Ballinriddera at openstreetmap.org
Ballinriddera at the IreAtlas Townland Data Base
Ballinriddera at Townlands.ie
Ballinriddera at The Placenames Database of Ireland

Townlands of County Westmeath